Minaprine (INN, USAN, BAN) (brand names Brantur, Cantor) is a monoamine oxidase inhibitor antidepressant drug that was used in France for the treatment of depression until it was withdrawn from the market in 1996 because it caused convulsions.

A study found that it acts as a reversible inhibitor of MAO-A (RIMA) in rats. In a study it has also been found to weakly inhibit acetylcholinesterase in rat brain (striatum) homogenates.

References 

Acetylcholinesterase inhibitors
Antidepressants
Aromatic amines
Monoamine oxidase inhibitors
4-Morpholinyl compunds
Pyridazines